Bilous is a Ukrainian-language surname literally meaning "a person with a white moustache". Russian-language names of the same derivation include Belous and Belousov (patronymic surname). The Polish-language equivalent is Białowąs, or, less commonly, Białous.

The surname Bilous or Belous may refer to:
 Deron Bilous (born 1975), Canadian politician
 Finn Bilous (born 1999), New Zealand freestyle skier
 Len Bilous (born 1948), American soccer player and coach

See also
 

Ukrainian-language surnames
Surnames of Ukrainian origin
Slavic-language surnames